Turrialba may refer to:

Places
 Turrialba Volcano
 Turrialba Volcano National Park, created around Turrialba Volcano.
 Turrialba (canton), located in Cartago Province
 Turrialba (district), located in Turrialba canton.

Other
 Turrialba cheese, created in the Santa Cruz district of Turrialba canton.